The Wild Birthday Cake is a 1949 American children's picture book written by Lavinia R. Davis and illustrated by Hildegard Woodward. The book describes what happens when a boy wonders what to take to a friend's party. The book was a recipient of a 1950 Caldecott Honor Book for its illustrations.

References

1949 children's books
American children's books
American picture books
Caldecott Honor-winning works
English-language books
Fictional children
Books about ducks
Birthdays in fiction
United States in fiction
Forests in fiction
Male characters in literature
Child characters in literature
Doubleday (publisher) books